Morgan Paull (December 15, 1944 – July 17, 2012) was an American actor most notable for playing Dave Holden in the Ridley Scott film Blade Runner.

Early life
Morgan Paull was born to a wealthy family in Wheeling, West Virginia and appeared in many high school plays. When he told his father that he wanted to attend Boston University to continue acting, his father disagreed with his plans and Morgan ran off. He went to the Barter Theatre in Abingdon, Virginia and then later appeared on Broadway in New Faces of 1965 and the off-Broadway show That Thing at the Cherry Lane.

Career
After moving to LA, he appeared in Muzeeka at the Mark Taper Forum and caught the attention of director Franklin Schaffner and producer Frank McCarthy. He made his acting debut in the 1970 film Patton playing Captain Richard N. Jenson. He was in the 1971 film Fools' Parade with Jimmy Stewart and the 1976 film The Last Hard Men with Charlton Heston. He is also known for playing the scheming Philip Wendell in the 1978 American television miniseries Centennial and a greedy businessman in the 1984 comedy Surf II.

Personal life
Paull was married four times, first to Gaye Huston in 1965 until they divorced in 1976. He was then married to Carmen Paull from 1976 to 1996, which ended in divorce. He was then married to April Paull in 1990 until that marriage ended in divorce. He later married Jenny Elam in 2004 until his death in 2012. Paull had two daughters.

Paull died on July 17, 2012 from stomach cancer in his home in Ashland, Oregon. He is buried in the Paull family plot, located in section 10 of Greenwood Cemetery, Wheeling, Ohio County, West Virginia.

Filmography

Film

Television

References

External links

1944 births
2012 deaths
American male film actors
American male television actors
Deaths from stomach cancer
Deaths from cancer in Oregon
Male actors from New York City
People from Lake Arrowhead, California